Songpan; former Songzhou, is a county of northwestern Sichuan province, China, and is one of the 13 counties administered by the Ngawa Tibetan and Qiang Autonomous Prefecture.

Transport
China National Highway 213
Jiuzhai Huanglong Airport

Economy and Tourism
The economy of Songpan is dominated by agriculture and livestock raising. In recent years, tourism has become an increasingly important sector, and is actively promoted by the authorities. Additionally, Songpan is popular among foreign students and other Chinese language learners staying in China as the base for treks through the scenic mountains nearby. Apart from the scenic attraction of Huanglong Scenic and Historic Interest Area which is located in the county, Songpan with its strategic location also acts as the gateway to Jiuzhaigou Valley at the north.

History

The ancient city of Songpan was built during the Tang dynasty and it was later rebuilt during Ming dynasty. Songpan was an important military post. It was also an important economic and trading center for horse and tea exchange between Sichuan, Gansu, Qinghai and Tibet.

During Tang rule, it was the border with the Tibetan Empire. Emperor Songtsen Gampo of Tibet tried to invade Tang China through this gate. Emperor Taizong of Tang offered him Princess Wencheng at Songzhou (now Songpan) in 641. According to Tibetan and Chinese legends, Princess Wencheng then brings with her among other things the Jowo statue to the Tibetan Empire. Throughout the Ming dynasty, the Chinese court was troubled by the frequent invasion of the Songpan area. The area was given to a Tibetan lama friendly with the Chinese court to maintain frontier control while leaving it in local hands.

In August 1935, led by Mao Zedong and Zhou Enlai, the retreating People's Liberation Army marched through the Songpan Grasslands to advance to the northwestern province.

While Songpan can be a charming city in its own right, the countryside surrounding the city offers a variety of tourist attractions. The hills surrounding the city are visual delights of Tibetan cattle herders leading their livestock over rolling grasses, endless valleys, and generally beautiful landscape. All of this can be seen through affordable horseback riding outlets on the outskirts of the city.

Geography and climate

Due to its altitude, Songpan has a humid continental climate (Köppen Dwb), with cool winters and warm, rainy summers. The high elevation also results in a large diurnal temperature variation, exceeding  in winter. With monthly percent possible sunshine ranging from 31% in September to 57% in December, the county seat receives 1,831 hours of bright sunshine annually.

Administrative divisions
Mao County has 7 townships:
Townships:
Anhong
Baiyang
Caoyuan
Hongtu
Hongxing
Xiaoxing
Zhenjiang

See also
Jiandi Dao
1976 Songpan-Pingwu earthquake

Gallery

References

External links

 Government Website
 Additional Songpan tourist information
 Songpan travel information

 
County-level divisions of Sichuan
Ngawa Tibetan and Qiang Autonomous Prefecture